Club Cola is a German cola soft drink.

Originally manufactured at the request of the Socialist Unity Party of Germany and other governmental organizations, Club Cola was created in order for East Germany to have its own cola soft drink that was similar in taste and appearance to those sold in the Western world.

The government announced a project to create the drink at the 1966 Leipzig Spring Fair. On 19 April 1967 the first Club Cola was bottled in East Berlin. This soft drink was so popular with East German citizens that Club Cola was awarded with gold in the category soft drinks at the 1972 Leipzig spring fair.

Club Cola today
In 1992, Club Cola was reintroduced to the German market under the new management of Spreequell Mineralbrunnen GmbH and is now available all over the country. It benefited from Ostalgie, nostalgia for East Germany, but is also being promoted as a youthful brand today.

References

External links

 New Club Cola producer's official website 

Cola brands
Products introduced in 1967
German drinks
Ostalgie
Goods manufactured in East Germany